Enrico Schiavetti (February 9, 1920 – February 16, 1993) was an Italian professional football player. Born in Tivoli, he played for 3 seasons (53 games, 1 goal) in the Serie A for A.S. Roma.

External links
Mention of Enrico Schiavetti's death 

1920 births
1993 deaths
People from Tivoli, Lazio
Italian footballers
Serie A players
A.S. Roma players
Palermo F.C. players
Association football midfielders
Footballers from Lazio
Sportspeople from the Metropolitan City of Rome Capital